Exilia expeditionis is a species of sea snail, a marine gastropod mollusk in the family Ptychatractidae.

Description

Distribution

References

Ptychatractidae
Gastropods described in 1956